Kobyly may refer to the following places:
 Kobyly, Bardejov District, a village in Slovakia
 Kobyly (Liberec District), a village in the Czech Republic
 Kobyły, a village in Poland